Route 69 may refer to:

London Buses route 69

See also
69 (disambiguation)
List of highways numbered 69

69